Ernest Elsworth Smith, Sr. (April 11, 1931 - May 22, 2012) played for the Baltimore Elite Giants of the Negro American League.

Honors and awards
Smith was the first member named to the Wythe County Sports Hall of Fame. He is also a member of the Bluefield State Hall of Fame.

Personal life
One of 15 children, Smith was born in Crystal, West Virginia and died at the age of 81 in Wytheville, Virginia.

See also
BDTOnline article

References

1931 births
2012 deaths
People from Mercer County, West Virginia
Baseball players from West Virginia
Baltimore Elite Giants players
African-American baseball players
20th-century African-American sportspeople
21st-century African-American people